Jean Marie Auel (born February 18, 1936) is an American writer who wrote the Earth's Children books, a series of novels set in prehistoric Europe that explores human activities during this time, and touches on the interactions of Cro-Magnon people with Neanderthals. Her books have sold more than 45 million copies worldwide.

Early years
Auel was born Jean Marie Untinen in 1936 in Chicago. She is of Finnish descent, the second of five children of Neil Solomon Untinen, a housepainter, and Martha (née Wirtanen) Untinen.

Auel attended the University of Portland. While a student, she joined Mensa and worked at Tektronix as a clerk (1965–1966), a circuit-board designer (1966–1973), a technical writer (1973–1974), and a credit manager (1974–1976). She earned an MBA from the University of Portland in 1976. She received honorary degrees from her alma mater, Pacific University, Portland State University, the University of Maine and the Mount Vernon College for Women.

Career as novelist
In 1977, Auel began extensive library research of the Ice Age for her first book. She joined a survival class to learn how to construct an ice cave, and learned primitive methods of making fire, tanning leather, and knapping stone from the aboriginal skills expert Jim Riggs.

The Clan of the Cave Bear was nominated for numerous literary awards, including an American Booksellers Association nomination for best first novel. It was also later adapted into a screenplay for the film of the same name.

After the sales success of her first book, Auel has been able to travel to the sites of prehistoric ruins and relics, and also to meet many of the experts with whom she had been corresponding. Her research has taken her across Europe from France to Ukraine, including most of what Marija Gimbutas called Old Europe. In 1986, she attended and co-sponsored a conference on modern human origins at the School of American Research, Santa Fe. She has developed a close friendship with Doctor Jean Clottes of France, who was responsible for the exploration of the Cosquer Cave discovered in 1985 and the Chauvet Cave discovered in 1994.

In October 2008, Auel was named an Officer of the Ordre des Arts et des Lettres by the French Minister of Culture and Communication.

Bibliography
By 1990, Auel's first three books in her Earth's Children series had sold more than 20 million copies worldwide and  been translated into 18 languages; Crown Publishers paid Auel about $25 million for the rights to publish The Plains of Passage and the two subsequent volumes. By May 2002, on the cusp of the publication of the fifth book, the series had sold 34 million books. The sixth and final book in the series, The Land of Painted Caves, was published in 2011.

 The Clan of the Cave Bear, 1980
 The Valley of Horses, 1982
 The Mammoth Hunters, 1985
 The Plains of Passage, 1990
 The Shelters of Stone, 2002
 The Land of Painted Caves, 2011

Personal life
Jean Marie Untinen married Ray Bernard Auel after high school. They have five children and live in Portland, Oregon in the Goose Hollow neighborhood.

References

External links

 
 
 
 Interview With Jean M. Auel by Meredith Allard in The Copperfield Review
 Audio(mp3, ram) Interview With Jean M. Auel by Don Swaim, December 2, 1985, New York.

Writers of fiction set in prehistoric times
American historical novelists
 
Writers from Chicago
University of Portland alumni
Portland State University alumni
Officiers of the Ordre des Arts et des Lettres
1936 births
Living people
American people of Finnish descent
Mensans
American women novelists
20th-century American novelists
21st-century American novelists
20th-century American women writers
21st-century American women writers
Tektronix people
Women historical novelists
Novelists from Illinois
Mount Vernon Seminary and College alumni